"Bichiyal" is a song by Puerto Rican rapper Bad Bunny featuring Yaviah from his third studio album YHLQMDLG (2020). It was released on March 13, 2020, as the seventh single from the album. The song was written by Benito Martínez, Ernesto Padilla, Jose Cruz, Freddy Montalvo and Javier Marcano and it was produced by Nesty and Subelo NEO.

Context
"Bichiyal" is a portmanteau of two popular slang words in Puerto Rico, "bicha" and "yal". The song is about a woman and the gap between Puerto Rico's upper-middle class and the poor.

Promotion and release
On February 28, 2020, Bad Bunny announced his third studio album that was revealed to be YHLQMDLG during his performance and guest appearance on The Tonight Show Starring Jimmy Fallon, which was released the following day.

Commercial performance
Following the releasing of its parent album, "Pero Ya No" charted at number 89 on the US Billboard Hot 100 dated March 14, 2020, becoming the lowest charting track from YHLQMDLG as well as peaking at number 11 on the US Hot Latin Songs chart upon the issue date of March 14, 2020. In Spain, "Pero Ya No" reached at number 22.

Audio visualizer
A visualizer video for the song was uploaded to YouTube on February 29, 2020, along with the other visualizer videos of the songs that appeared on YHLQMDLG.

Music video
A music video for "Bichiyal" was released on March 13, 2020, on YouTube.

Charts

Weekly charts

Year-end charts

References

External links
 
 

2020 songs
2020 singles
Bad Bunny songs
Songs written by Bad Bunny